"The Flame" is a power ballad written by British songwriters Bob Mitchell and Nick Graham. The song was released in 1988 by the American rock band Cheap Trick and the first single from their tenth album Lap of Luxury.

"The Flame" reached number one on the Billboard Hot 100 in July 1988, becoming the band's only number one hit. It also reached number one in Australia and Canada.

Background 
During the recording of the Lap of Luxury album, Epic Records asked Cheap Trick to work with outside songwriters, a request which guitarist Rick Nielsen, the band's main songwriter, was apprehensive about. 

Prior to being offered to Cheap Trick, "The Flame" was first offered to British blues rock singer Elkie Brooks, who turned it down. "The Flame" was written by Nick Graham, a former member of the British rock band Atomic Rooster, and Bob Mitchell.

Cheap Trick drummer Bun E. Carlos recalled that "The Flame" was offered to the band by the vice president of Epic Records along with the Diane Warren song "Look Away"; "[He] told us he had these two songs and they're both gonna be #1. He goes, 'We got one for you and one for the group Chicago, but you can have first choice.' He said, 'I think the one 'The Flame' would be good for you guys.' The other one was 'Look Away,' and it sounded like some girl singing on the demo. We really didn't like that song anyway, so 'Sure, we'll do 'The Flame.' We're game.'"

Reportedly, the band disliked the song at first; Rick Nielsen disliked the song so much on first hearing that he yanked it from the tape player and ground the cassette beneath his boot heel. In 2021, Nielsen emphasized that he did not dislike "The Flame" and thought there was "Probably more good than bad on it."

A promotional music video was created for the single, receiving frequent airplay on MTV. In the video, Nielsen can be seen using a guitar designed after the band's previous 1986 album The Doctor. The video was produced by Paul Flattery and directed by Jim Yukich. PopMatters critic Dennis Shin rated the video as one of "20 '80s music videos that have aged terribly" on the basis of the band "not [seeming] to be enjoying themselves" and that their individuality is suppressed to make them look like a typical hair band shooting a video for a power ballad.

Considered as the band's comeback album following the commercial failure of the 1986 album The Doctor, Lap of Luxury spawned three top 40 hit singles and one minor hit single. After "The Flame" topped the American Billboard Hot 100, a cover of Elvis Presley's "Don't Be Cruel" peaked at #4. The third single "Ghost Town" continued the commercial success, peaking at #33 whilst the fourth single "Never Had a Lot to Lose" peaked at #75. The album opener "Let Go" also peaked at #32 on the American Billboard Mainstream Rock chart. The success of "The Flame" brought the group out of a years-long commercial slump and back into music industry prominence. It was the band's only number one single in America. It also became the band's first hit on the Billboard Adult Contemporary chart, reaching #29 there; "Don't Be Cruel" then hit #32 on the AC chart.

In the UK, the song peaked at #77 during mid-1988 for a total of 9 weeks. A re-issue exclusively for the UK saw the song re-chart at #87 for two weeks in early 1989.

Since the song's release, the band has performed the song on many occasions during their live concerts.  Robin Zander had one of his guitars altered to attempt to better mimic the recorded sound on live shows, by adding a 7th string in the G position. 

A previously unreleased live version of the song was included on the 2000 compilation Authorized Greatest Hits which featured sixteen tracks handpicked by the band themselves.

A live version was recorded for the 2001 live set Silver.

"Through the Night" 
The B-side "Through the Night" was a non-LP track, exclusive to the single. It would later appear on the 1996 box-set Sex, America, Cheap Trick. It was written by Rick Nielsen, Robin Zander and Tom Petersson.

Release
As a worldwide release, the song was released on 7" vinyl, 12" vinyl and CD single. All 7" vinyl versions featured the A-side and the same B-side "Through the Night". In both Spain and the Netherlands, a promotional 7" vinyl featured the A-side on both sides of the vinyl. For the 7" singles, the song was edited down from 5:39 to 4:30, a minute less compared to the album version.

In the Netherlands, a 12" vinyl was released which featured the album version of "The Flame", the B-side "Through the Night", as well as an extra track, the "Lap of Luxury" album track "All We Need is a Dream", written by American keyboardist Gregg Giuffria, Rick Nielsen and Robin Zander. In the UK, an alternate 12" vinyl was released which featured the album version of "The Flame", the B-side "Through the Night", the 1977 studio version of the band's 1979 hit "I Want You to Want Me" from the album "In Color", written solely by Rick Nielsen and the 1982 minor hit single "If You Want My Love", also written solely by Nielsen from the album "One on One". In America, a promotional 12" vinyl was released, with the A-side being the album version, titled "The Flame (Long Version)" and the B-side being the single version, titled "The Flame (Short Version)".

In the UK and Europe, a maxi-single CD was released which featured the same tracks as the UK 12" vinyl; "The Flame (Album Version)", "Through the Night", "I Want You to Want Me" and "If You Want My Love". In the Netherlands, a mini-CD single was released, featuring the same tracks as on the Dutch 12" vinyl; the album version of "The Flame", "Through the Night" and "All We Need is a Dream". In Japan, a mini-CD single was released, featuring the two 7" vinyl tracks "The Flame" and "Through the Night".

"The Flame", "Through the Night" and "All We Need is a Dream" was produced by Richie Zito who produced the entire Lap of Luxury album and would also produce the band's following 1990 album Busted. "I Want You to Want Me" was produced by American producer Tom Werman and "If You Want My Love" was produced by Roy Thomas Baker.

Critical reception
In a review of the song for AllMusic, Steve Huey described "The Flame" as a "lush power ballad" which Cheap Trick "made their own with Zander's sobbing vocal dramatics and the haunting tones of Nielsen's mandocello chiming behind the guitar and keyboard backing". He considered the lyrics to hint at the Police's "Every Breath You Take" "school of disguising unhealthy obsession as sentimentality". In a review of Lap of Luxury, Ira Robbins of Rolling Stone noted that "emotional singing and an affecting Nielsen solo make "The Flame" memorable, if not quite equal to the band's best ballads".

Cash Box called it a "great melodic rock tune, and a radio smash."

Track listing
7" Single
"The Flame" – 4:30
"Through the Night" – 4:15

7" Single (Dutch and UK release)
"The Flame" – 4:30
"Through the Night" – 4:10

7" Single (Dutch and Spanish promo)
"The Flame" – 4:30
"The Flame" – 4:30

12" Single (Dutch release)
"The Flame" – 5:37
"Through the Night" – 4:10
"All We Need is a Dream" – 4:19

12" Single (UK release)
"The Flame (Album Version)" – 5:37
"Through the Night" – 4:10
"I Want You to Want Me (Album Version)" – 3:09
"If You Want My Love" – 3:35

12" Single (American promo)
"The Flame (Long Version)" – 5:37
"The Flame (Short Version)" – 4:30

CD Maxi Single (UK and European release)
"The Flame (Album Version)" – 5:37
"Through the Night" – 4:10
"I Want You to Want Me" – 3:09
"If You Want My Love" – 3:35

CD Mini Single (Dutch release)
"The Flame" – 5:37
"Through the Night" – 4:10
"All We Need is a Dream" – 4:19

CD Mini Single (Japanese release)
"The Flame" – 5:37
"Through the Night" – 4:10

Charts

Original release

Year-end charts

UK 1989 re-issue

Erin Hamilton version

"The Flame" was covered in 1998 by electronic dance music singer Erin Hamilton. Included on her 1999 album One World, the song was a top-twenty hit on the U.S. Hot Dance Club Play chart. Nine years later, the song was remixed and re-released as "The Flame 08" and this version went to number one on the U.S. dance chart, becoming Hamilton's first chart-topper.

Personnel 
 Robin Zander – lead vocals, rhythm guitar
 Rick Nielsen – lead guitar, backing vocals
 Tom Petersson – bass, backing vocals
 Bun E. Carlos – drums, percussion

Additional personnel 
 Producer on "The Flame", "Through the Night" and "All We Need is a Dream" – Richie Zito
 Engineer/Mixer on "The Flame", "Through the Night" and "All We Need is a Dream" – Phil Kaffel
 Second engineer on "The Flame", "Through the Night" and "All We Need is a Dream" – Jim Champagne
 Second engineer on "The Flame", "Through the Night" and "All We Need is a Dream" – Bernard Frings
 Second engineer on "The Flame", "Through the Night" and "All We Need is a Dream" – Mike Tacci
 Second engineer on "The Flame", "Through the Night" and "All We Need is a Dream" – Bob Vogt
 Second engineer on "The Flame", "Through the Night" and "All We Need is a Dream" – Toby Wright
 Producer on "I Want You to Want Me" – Tom Werman
 Engineer on "I Want You to Want Me" – Antonino Reale
 Mastering on "I Want You to Want Me" – George Marino
 Producer on "If You Want My Love" – Roy Thomas Baker
 Engineer on "If You Want My Love" – Ian Taylor
 Assistant on "If You Want My Love" – Paul Klingberg
 Mastering on "If You Want My Love" – George Marino
 Writers of "The Flame" – Bob Mitchell, Nick Graham
 Writers of "Through the Night" – Rick Nielsen, Robin Zander, Tom Petersson
 Writers of "All We Need is a Dream" – Gregg Giuffria, Rick Nielsen, Robin Zander
 Writers of "I Want You to Want Me" – Rick Nielsen
 Writers of "If You Want My Love" – Rick Nielsen

References

1987 songs
1988 singles
1999 singles
2008 singles
Cheap Trick songs
Billboard Hot 100 number-one singles
Cashbox number-one singles
Number-one singles in Australia
RPM Top Singles number-one singles
Song recordings produced by Richie Zito
Epic Records singles
Songs written by Nick Graham (musician)
Glam metal ballads
1980s ballads